South Elmwood is the southernmost neighborhood in Providence, Rhode Island, and is home to Roger Williams Park and the Roger Williams Park Zoo. The neighborhood is bounded to the northwest by Interstate 95, to the northeast by Broad Street and Verndale Avenue, and on all other sides by the municipal boundary with Cranston. The population of the neighborhood, as of 2000, was 2,184.

The neighborhood is 38.9% Non-Hispanic White, 7.6% Asian or Pacific Islander, 18.2% African-American, and 32.9% Hispanic. The median household income is $36,868, and the median family income is $42,896. 15.4% of families live below the poverty line.

References

Neighborhoods in Providence, Rhode Island